The Công River is a tributary of the Red River in northern Vietnam. It flows through Thái Nguyên Province. The river is 96 km in length and has a catchment area of 951 square kilometres. It flows from Núi Cốc Lake and also passes through the town of Sông Công.

Rivers of Thái Nguyên province
Rivers of Vietnam